Drew "D.J." Davis (born January 4, 1989) is an American football wide receiver who is currently a free agent. He played college football for the University of Oregon. The Falcons signed him as an undrafted free agent in 2011.

Professional career
Davis signed with the Atlanta Falcons as an undrafted free agent on July 26, 2011. He was released on September 3 for final roster cuts before the start of the 2011 season. The next day, he was added to the team's practice squad.

Davis was released again on August 31, 2012 for final roster cuts for the 2012 season and signed to practice squad the next day. On September 8, he was promoted to the active 53-man roster. He made his NFL debut in the Week 1 win against the Kansas City Chiefs.
In week 8, Davis scored his first touchdown against the Philadelphia Eagles on a 15-yard pass by Matt Ryan.

References

External links
 Atlanta Falcons profile
 Oregon profile
 

1989 births
Living people
American football wide receivers
Atlanta Falcons players
Oregon Ducks football players
UCF Knights football coaches
Sportspeople from Denver
Coaches of American football from Colorado
Players of American football from Denver
African-American players of American football
African-American coaches of American football
21st-century African-American sportspeople
20th-century African-American people